"The Show Must Go On" (working titles "Who's Sorry Now", "(It's) Never Too Late") is a song by English rock band Pink Floyd, from their 1979 album The Wall. It was written by Roger Waters and sung by David Gilmour.

Recording and lyrics
Roger Waters wanted to create a "Beach Boys" type sound for the backing vocals, and got Bruce Johnston to come and help create it, but this was only after the Beach Boys themselves had agreed to do so, only to cancel at the last possible moment (the morning of the session, 2 October 1979). The song's chord patterns closely resemble those found in "Mother", "In the Flesh", and "Waiting for the Worms".

The track does not appear in the 1982 film version of The Wall nor in Waters' post-Pink Floyd 1990 concert The Wall – Live in Berlin. It also has an extra verse that was cut from the studio album, but is nevertheless included in the lyrics printed on its sleeve.

  Do I have to stand up
  Wild eyed in the spotlight
  What a nightmare 
  Why don't I turn and run</poem>

After this, the line "There must be some mistake..." starts.

The full song was performed live in concert, and as such appears on Is There Anybody Out There? The Wall Live 1980–81. It was also included on Waters' 2010-2013 solo Wall tour, and is included in the concert film and album of that tour.

It's the only song from the album which Waters does not perform any kind of instrument and vocal, although his voice is audible on unofficially released recordings of the demo. He is heard singing a verse that was cut from the final version and has never been played live, located right before David Gilmour's bridge:

<poem>
  Am I really unsure,
  Wild eyed in the spotlight?
  Fuck me, what a nightmare
  Who's there?
  Have they all gone?

  It's okay, now you're in luck,
  The worms have fled the rising sun.
  Their evil power is on the wane.
  Forget the past and start again.

  There must be some mistake...

Plot

As with the other songs on The Wall, "The Show Must Go On" tells a segment of the story of Pink, the story's protagonist. This song leads into "In the Flesh", where the show is performed by Pink as he begins to mentally unravel and hallucinate that he is a fascist dictator.

Personnel
Music & lyrics by Roger Waters

David Gilmour – vocals, guitars, bass guitar, roto toms
Nick Mason – drums
Richard Wright – synthesiser

with:

Bob Ezrin – synthesiser, piano
Bruce Johnston – backing vocals
Joe Chemay – backing vocals
Stan Farber – backing vocals
Jim Haas – backing vocals
John Joyce – backing vocals
Toni Tennille – backing vocals

Personnel per Fitch and Mahon.

References

Further reading
Fitch, Vernon. The Pink Floyd Encyclopedia (3rd edition), 2005. .

Songs about theatre
1979 songs
Pink Floyd songs
Songs written by Roger Waters
Song recordings produced by Bob Ezrin
Song recordings produced by David Gilmour
Song recordings produced by Roger Waters